The 1993–94 Slovak Extraliga season was the inaugural season of the Slovak Extraliga, following the peaceful dissolution of Czechoslovakia midway through the 1992–93 Czechoslovak Extraliga season (which all Slovak and Czech teams played to completion). 10 teams participated in the league, and Dukla Trencin won the championship.

Standings

Playoffs

Semifinal
 Dukla Trenčín - Martimex ZŤS Martin 3:1 (7:2,4:2,2:3,3:1)
 HC Košice - Slovan Bratislava 3:2 (7:4,1:2,5:2,1:2,4:1)

3rd place 
 Slovan Bratislava-Martimex ZŤS Martin 1:2 (7:1,1:4,3:4)

Final
 Dukla Trenčín - HC Košice 3:2 (2:3,4:1,5:6,3:2,5:1)

Final rankings

External links
 Slovak Ice Hockey Federation

Slovak Extraliga seasons
slovak
Slovak